Lady Bodyguard is a 1943 American comedy film directed by William Clemens. The film stars Eddie Albert, Anne Shirley',  Raymond Walburn,  Roger Pryor', Edward Brophy, Maude Eburne, Clem Bevans and Mary Treen. The film was released on January 2, 1943, by Paramount Pictures.

Plot

Cast 
Eddie Albert as Terry Moore
Anne Shirley as A.C. Baker
Raymond Walburn as Avery Jamieson
Roger Pryor as George MacAlister
Edward Brophy as Harry Gargan
Maude Eburne as Mother Hodges
Clem Bevans as Elmer Frawley
Mary Treen as Miss Tracy

References

External links 
 

1943 films
American comedy films
Paramount Pictures films
1943 comedy films
Films produced by Sol C. Siegel
American black-and-white films
Films scored by Paul Sawtell
1940s English-language films
1940s American films